Güləbatlı (also, Qüləbatlı) is a village and municipality in the Tartar Rayon of Azerbaijan. It has a population of 371.

References

Populated places in Tartar District